Clusters College For Media & Design/Clusters School of Digital Arts is a film, visual effects, television, animation and media arts institute in India, providing education in technical aspects of the media and entertainment industry.

See also
 Film and Television Institute of India
 Government Film and Television Institute
 State Institute of Film and Television
 Satyajit Ray Film and Television Institute

References

Colleges in Bangalore
Arts and Science colleges in Kerala
Film schools in India
Animation schools in India
Digital media schools